Spillers was a British company that owned flour mills.

Spillers may also refer to:

 Spillers Records, a shop in Cardiff, Wales
 Ashley Spillers (born 1986), an American actress
 Hortense Spillers (born 1942), an American literary critic